OpTic Texas (formerly the Dallas Empire) is an American professional Call of Duty League (CDL) esports team based in Dallas, Texas. OpTic Texas is owned by OpTic Gaming. Dallas was announced as one of the first five cities to host a CDL team.

History

Dallas Empire 
On May 2, 2019, Activision Blizzard announced that Envy Gaming had purchased one of the first five franchise slots for the Call of Duty League. According to ESPN, the publisher was looking to sell slots for approximately $25 million per team. Starting on October 14, 2019, and over the next 5 days Dallas announced their starting 5 man roster culminating with the announcement of their branding, the Dallas Empire. On August 30, 2020, Dallas Empire won the 2020 Call of Duty League Championship. On September 1, 2020, Clayster announced on his Twitter account that he would go into the 2021 as a restricted free agent as a result of the Call of Duty League moving back to a 4v4 format.

The team started the 2021 season well, finishing 2nd at Stage 1 and 3rd at Stage 2. However, during Stage 3 the team announced that Huke would be moved to the substitute position with FeLo joining the starting roster. Following a disappointing 7th/8th finishing during Stage 3 the team announced another change to the team's roster with Vivid being acquired from the Los Angeles Guerrillas, resulting in FeLo once again being moved to the substitute position. The team showed improvement, resulting in a 2nd finish at Stage 4 after a 5–4 loss to the Atlanta FaZe in the Grand Finals. This result was followed up with a 4th finishing during Stage 5, resulting in the team finishing 3rd in the Regular Season standings. At the Championship Weekend the team finished 3rd following losses to the Atlanta FaZe and Toronto Ultra. After the end of the 2021 season the team announced Ian "Crimsix" Porter and Reece "Vivid" Drost would be leaving the team with both players becoming a Restricted Free Agent.

OpTic Texas 
Ahead of the 2022 season, the team was renamed to OpTic Texas following the merger of Envy and OpTic Gaming.

In November 2021, it was announced that Envy Gaming would acquire the OpTic Gaming brand as part of a merger. OpTic Gaming leader Hector “HECZ” Rodriguez joined the combined companies’ ownership group and was to serve as President of OpTic Gaming. This also brought the OpTic Texas roster for Activision Blizzard's Call of Duty League into the Envy family. In June 2022, it was announced Envy Gaming would retire the Envy brand, and fully become OpTic Gaming, thus moving the ownership of the OpTic Texas brand officially under the OpTic Gaming banner completely.

During the 2022 season the team won Stage 1, followed by a top 6 place finishes at Stage 2 & Stage 3 and a top 4 finish at Stage 4, resulting in a second-place finish in the overall standings. At the 2022 Championship the team finished 4th following a 3–0 loss to the Los Angeles Thieves and a 3–1 loss to the Seattle Surge.

In August 2022, the team announced that it would be parting ways with Brandon "Dashy" Otell and Inderwir "iLLeY" Dhaliwal ahead of the 2023 season. A day later however, the team announced that both players would still be part of the team for the 2023 season. After a disappointing Top 12 finish at Major I, the team decided to pick up Cuyler "Huke" Garland to replace Dashy.

On January 17, 2023, Seth "Scump" Abner released a video announcing his retirement ahead of Major II. In the video, it was also announced that Brandon "Dashy" Otell would be returning to the team for Major II. Following a fourth place finish at Major II, the team dropped Inderwir "iLLeY" Dhaliwal from the starting roster and added amateur player Daniel "Ghosty" Rothe.

Team identity 
The original name "Dallas Empire" was derived from the lyrics, "O Empire wide and glorious, you stand supremely blest," of the Texas state song Texas, Our Texas. The team's original primary colors were black and gold, with a secondary color of blue, to represent their regal theme. Their logo displayed a crown, with the points being made up of a stylized N and V, as a nod to Envy Gaming's history in competitive Call of Duty.

Current roster

References

External links
 

Venture capital-funded esports teams
Esports teams based in the United States
Call of Duty League teams
Esports teams established in 2019